The Arrondissement of Brussels-Periphery was an administrative arrondissement in the Belgian Province of Brabant. It existed from 1963 to 1971 and comprised the six municipalities in the Brussels periphery with language facilities.

History

The arrondissement was created in 1963, when the bilingual Arrondissement of Brussels was split up into three administrative arrondissements: the bilingual Arrondissement of Brussels-Capital, the unilingual Dutch-speaking Arrondissement of Halle-Vilvoorde and a peculiar arrondissement that officially didn't have a name, but was commonly referred to as Brussels-Periphery, and which comprised the six municipalities with language facilities around Brussels. It ceased to exist in 1971, when it was subsumed into Halle-Vilvoorde.

Municipalities

The arrondissement consisted of the following municipalities:
Drogenbos
Kraainem
Linkebeek
Sint-Genesius-Rode
Wemmel
Wezembeek-Oppem

Brussels-Periphery

References